The Inbiomyiidae are a family of flies first described in 2006. 11 species have been described all in the genus Inbiomyia distributed in the Neotropical region. These are very small, mostly dark flies. The larval biology remains unknown.

Family characteristics 
For terms see Morphology of Diptera. Inbiomyiidae are minute to small (1.3 to 1.6 mm) flies.

Characteristics of the family include an extremely shortened head with nonfunctional ptilinum and reduced chaetotaxy and a shortened first flagellomere with very elongate, dorsoapically inserted arista. The labellar lobes of the proboscis are largely separate and point in different directions. The mid tibia lacks an apicoventral bristle. There are also unusual features of the male and female genitalia.

The eggs are large and extremely flattened and are only present in the female abdomen in small numbers.

Species
Inbiomyia acmophallus Buck, 2006
Inbiomyia anemosyris Buck, 2006
Inbiomyia anodonta Buck, 2006
Inbiomyia azevedoi Riccardi & Amorim, 2019
Inbiomyia empheres Buck, 2006
Inbiomyia exul Buck, 2006
Inbiomyia matamata Buck, 2006
Inbiomyia mcalpineorum Buck, 2006
Inbiomyia pterygion Buck, 2006
Inbiomyia regina Buck, 2006
Inbiomyia scoliostylus Buck, 2006
Inbiomyia zeugodonta Buck, 2006

References 

Carnoidea
Diptera of South America
Diptera of North America